Verrett is a surname of French origin. Notable people with the surname include:

Durek Verrett, (born 1974), American businessman
Jason Verrett (born 1991), American football player
Logan Verrett (born 1990), American baseball player
Shirley Verrett (1931–2010), American opera singer
Stan Verrett, American sports announcer

See also
Verret (disambiguation)